Ivshinagnostus is a genus of trilobite in the order Agnostida, which existed in what is now Kazakhstan. It was described by Ergaliev in 1980, and the type species is Ivshinagnostus ivshini.

References

Agnostidae
Fossils of Kazakhstan